DiCicco (also Di Cicco and Dicicco) is a surname. Notable people with the name include:

 Bobby Di Cicco, Italian-American actor
 Dennis di Cicco (born 1950), American astronomer and discoverer of minor planets
 Domenick DiCicco (born 1963), American politician from New Jersey
 Frank DiCicco (born c. 1946), American politician on the Philadelphia City Council
 Jessica DiCicco (born 1980), American voice, film and television actress
 Pat DiCicco (1909–1978), American agent, movie producer, and actor
 Pier Giorgio Di Cicco (1949–2019), Italian-Canadian poet
 Sue DiCicco (born 1959), American sculptor, children's book author and illustrator
 Tony DiCicco (1948–2017), American soccer player, coach, and commentator

See also
 3841 Dicicco, named after Dennis di Cicco
 De Cicco v. Schweizer, 1917 American court case concerning privity of contract and consideration
 DeCicco Building, historic building in Portland, Oregon
 De Cecco, Italian pasta company
De Cecco (surname)
 Di Cocco, a list of people with the surname DiCocco and similar